The Mercedes-Benz M03 engine is a naturally-aspirated, 3.0-liter, straight-6, internal combustion piston engine, designed, developed and produced by Mercedes-Benz; between 1926 and 1927.

M03 engine
Power was transmitted via a four-speed manual transmission to the rear wheels which were fixed to a rigid axle suspended from semi-elliptic leaf springs. The braking applied to all four wheels, mechanically controlled using rod linkages.

Applications
Mercedes-Benz 12/55 hp Type 300 Sedan

References

Mercedes-Benz engines
Straight-six engines
Engines by model
Gasoline engines by model